The Wagner-Werk-Verzeichnis (Catalogue of Wagner's Works), abbreviated WWV, is an index and musicological guide to the 113 musical compositions and works for the stage by Richard Wagner. It includes guidance on editions of the published works and explanations of historical performance practices. John Deathridge, Martin Geck, and Egon Voss compiled the catalogue.

In compiling the catalogue, the authors studied Wagner's writings and examined drafts, sketches, and scores of the compositions. For the full list, see List of compositions by Richard Wagner.

See also
List of works for the stage by Richard Wagner
Bach-Werke-Verzeichnis
Händel-Werke-Verzeichnis
Werkverzeichnis Anton Bruckner

References
Deathridge J., Geck M. and Voss E. (1986). Wagner-Werk-Verzeichnis (WWV): Verzeichnis der musikalischen Werke Richard Wagners und ihrer Quellen ["Catalogue of Wagner's Works: Catalogue of Musical Compositions by Richard Wagner and Their Sources"]. Mainz, London, & New York: Schott Music International. .

External links
 Listing of the WWV 

Wagner, Richard
Wagner studies